This is a list of scheduled year-round and seasonal destinations served by French low-cost airline Transavia France (formerly transavia.com France) as of December 2019. The first Transavia flight was on 12 May 2007 between Paris Orly airport to Porto. The airline reaches in the summer 2023 120 short and medium-haul destinations with 100 destinations from Paris Orly.

Destinations

See also
List of Air France destinations
List of KLM destinations
List of KLM Cityhopper destinations
List of Transavia destinations

References

Lists of airline destinations
Air France–KLM
France transport-related lists